Hickory Grove is a historic home located near Romney, Hampshire County, West Virginia. It was built in 1849, and is a three-story, red brick dwelling. It sits on a stone foundation and has a hipped, standing-seam metal roof with four large brick chimneys. The front facade features a Greek Revival style trabeated entrance. The north section was built in 1892, and replaced an earlier log structure.

It was listed on the National Register of Historic Places in 2012.

References

1849 establishments in Virginia
Buildings and structures in Romney, West Virginia
Greek Revival houses in West Virginia
Houses completed in 1849
Houses in Hampshire County, West Virginia
Houses on the National Register of Historic Places in West Virginia
National Register of Historic Places in Hampshire County, West Virginia
Plantation houses in West Virginia